Pleistoannelida is a group of annelid worms that comprises the vast majority of the diversity in phylum Annelida. Discovered through phylogenetic analyses, it is the largest clade of annelids, comprised by the last common ancestor of the highly diverse sister groups Errantia and Sedentaria (Clitellata and related polychaetes) and all the descendants of that ancestor.

Phylogeny
Pleistoannelida is composed by two big clades: Errantia (eunicids, siboglinids and related polychaetes) and Sedentaria (spoon worms, tubeworms, clitellates and related polychaetes). There are also smaller groups of difficult placement, such as Myzostomida and Spintheridae, that belong to either one of them. Closely related to Pleistoannelida is a grade of basal annelids: the Amphinomida/Sipunculida/Lobatocerebrum clade, Chaetopterida and Palaeoannelida.

A possible, closer sister group to Pleistoannelida could be Dinophiliformia, a clade containing interstitial (meiofaunal) genera previously found in Orbiniida (Sedentaria).

A 2019 analysis recovered the mesozoan group Orthonectida as the sister group to Pleistoannelida. However, a more recent 2022 analysis found a monophyletic Orthonectida+Dicyemida clade localized outside of the annelids, between Gnathifera and Platyhelminthes.

References

Annelid unranked clades
Polychaetes